William Marriott may refer to:

William Marriott (engineer) (1857–1943), engineer and locomotive superintendent
William Marriott (baseball) (1893–1969), baseball player, 1917–1927
William Marriott (magician) (ca. 1910), British magician and psychic debunker
William Thackeray Marriott (1834–1903), MP
William Hammond Marriott (1790–1851), American politician in the Maryland House of Delegates
William Marriott (cricketer) (1850–1887), English cricketer
Bill Marriott (footballer) (1880–1944), English footballer

See also
Bill Marriott (born 1932), American businessman